Kendall Duane Cross (born February 24, 1968) is an American freestyle wrestler, wrestling coach and Olympic gold medalist. He won the gold medal at the 1996 Summer Olympics in Atlanta, Georgia, where he wrestled in the 57 kilogram (125.5 pounds) weight class. He defeated Guivi Sissaouri of Canada 5–3 in the final match. Cross also competed at the 1992 Summer Olympics where he placed sixth.

Early career
In high school, Cross wrestled for Mustang High School in Mustang, Oklahoma where he won a state title.
He wrestled collegiately for Oklahoma State University where he was a three time All-American and won the NCAA Championship in 1989.  Kendall graduated from OSU with a major in political science and economics.

Highlight achievements

Distinguished Member of the National Wrestling Hall of Fame, inducted 2002
Three time US National Champion
Outstanding Freestyle Wrestler at the U. S. Nationals, 1992 and 1995
1997 USA Wrestling Athlete of the Year
Espoir National and Espoir World Cup Champion, 1988
Bronze medal at Junior World Championships, 1986
World Cup Champion, 1997
Olympic Champion, 1996

Coaching
After college he served as an assistant coach at University of North Carolina Chapel Hill in Chapel Hill, NC while training for the Olympics.  He also served as a coach for the Sunkist Kids and the Dave Schultz Wrestling Clubs.  Kendall went on to become an assistant coach at Harvard University and worked at Merrill Lynch in Boston.  While in Boston, he founded the Kendall Cross Gold Medal Wrestling Club, which developed young athletes. Then After Moving to Dallas, helped coach at Dallas Dynamite, with other Olympians Brandon Slay and Jamill Kelly. In addition to help Head coach at Dallas Dynamite (Brandon and Jamill both coach for the US National team currently) with former Oklahoma wrestler, Melvin Lofton, he also coaches at Trinity Christian Academy high school wrestling team.

Family
Kendall has two children, Kennedy and London Cross, and currently resides in New York City.

See also
 List of Oklahoma State University Olympians

References

External links
 Encyclopedia of Oklahoma History and Culture - Cross, Kendall

1968 births
Living people
Harvard Crimson coaches
Olympic gold medalists for the United States in wrestling
Wrestlers at the 1992 Summer Olympics
Wrestlers at the 1996 Summer Olympics
American male sport wrestlers
People from Hardin, Montana
People from Mustang, Oklahoma
Oklahoma State Cowboys wrestlers
Medalists at the 1996 Summer Olympics